Clinton Lynwood Lott III (April 9, 1950 – March 22, 2018) was an American professional golfer.

Lott was born in Douglas, Georgia. He won several amateur golf tournaments in Georgia including the Georgia State Junior Amateur, Georgia State Amateur, and Georgia Open, as a 17-year-old amateur. He played college golf at the University of Georgia where he was a two-time All-American. During his time at UGA, the team won four consecutive Southeastern Conference titles and Lott won two individual events.

Lott played on the PGA Tour from 1974 to 1984. His best finishes were three third-place finishes: 3rd at the 1976 Canadian Open, T-3 at the 1977 Byron Nelson Golf Classic, and T-3 at the 1981 Greater Milwaukee Open. He twice finished in the top-10 in a major: T-7 at the 1977 U.S. Open and T-8 at the 1976 U.S. Open.

Lott was inducted into the Georgia Sports Hall of Fame in 1998 and the Georgia Golf Hall of Fame in 2005.

Lott died March 22, 2018, following complications from surgery to remove a brain tumor in October 2017.

Amateur wins
1967 Georgia State Junior Amateur
196? Southeastern Junior Amateur
19?? Georgia State Jaycees Championship
1972 Georgia State Amateur
19?? Future Masters

Professional wins
1967 Georgia Open (as an amateur)

Results in major championships

Note: Lott never played in The Open Championship.

CUT = missed the half-way cut
"T" = tied

See also
1973 PGA Tour Qualifying School graduates
1982 PGA Tour Qualifying School graduates
1983 PGA Tour Qualifying School graduates

References

External links

American male golfers
Georgia Bulldogs men's golfers
PGA Tour golfers
Golfers from Georgia (U.S. state)
People from Douglas, Georgia
Deaths from brain cancer in the United States
Deaths from cancer in Georgia (U.S. state)
1950 births
2018 deaths